Correlations is the third studio album by the German electronic music group Ashra, released in 1979. It is the first Ashra album to feature a full band; the first two albums under the name had actually been Manuel Göttsching solo albums.

The album features a cover designed by Storm Thorgerson of Hipgnosis.

In 2008, the album was reissued as a limited 5-CD box set under the title Correlations Complete. This release includes the original album, the previously released 3-CD set The Making Of and the previously unreleased original mix, titled Phantasus.

Track listing

 Original album

 Correlations Complete edition

Personnel
Manuel Göttsching: Guitar, keyboards, synthesizer
Harald Grosskopf: Drums, percussion, synthesizer
Lutz Ulbrich: Guitar, keyboards

References

Ashra (band) albums
1979 albums
Albums with cover art by Hipgnosis